Douglas Falls are a 60-foot waterfall located in Buncombe County, North Carolina, United States. It is on a tributary of Waterfall Creek which flows into the Ivy River, and it is within the Big Ivy section of the Pisgah National Forest. The stream flows off the slope of Craggy Pinnacle, starting just below the Blue Ridge Parkway. It is surrounded by a forest of very large Eastern Hemlock trees, which are dead following attack by the Hemlock Wooly Adelgid. Visitors should be very careful when visiting this falls, as the dead Hemlocks will start to decay and fall within the next few years.

Natural history
The falls are located on a tributary of Waterfall Creek, which eventually flows into Carter Creek.

History
Douglas Falls was supposedly named for William O. Douglas, a Supreme Court Justice and author of Of Men and Mountains: The Classic Memoir of Wilderness Adventure.

Visiting the falls
The trail to the falls is located at the far end of a parking lot 4.7 miles from Walker Falls on F.R. 74. Visitors may follow a 0.55 mile path to the base of the falls. The trail continues up the mountain and becomes difficult after reaching the falls, eventually connecting with the Mountains to Sea Trail just below Craggy Pinnacle. From there, hikers can go in either direction to reach the Parkway; going right takes leads to the Craggy Gardens Visitor Center. Many hikers hike down to Douglas Falls from there.

Nearby falls
 Cascades Waterfall - 1.4 miles further down the trail from Douglas Falls, the trail crosses Waterfall Creek at Cascades Waterfall, a steep sliding waterfall above and below the trail. Visitors are encouraged to be extremely careful, since the crossing is extremely dangerous. It is generally regarded as not worth the hike just to see the other falls, but the other scenery along the trail and a connection to the Blue Ridge Parkway makes it see some use. Very large trees grow along this section of trail.
 Walker Falls
 Glassmine Falls
 Mitchell Falls
 Setrock Creek Falls
 Roaring Fork Falls
 Whiteoak Creek Falls

See also
 Blackwater River (West Virginia), a tributary of which also has a "Douglas Falls"

References

External links
Craggy Gardens Page at NCWaterfalls.com

Protected areas of Buncombe County, North Carolina
Waterfalls of North Carolina
Pisgah National Forest
Landforms of Buncombe County, North Carolina